Cocktails is a 1928 British silent comedy film directed by Monty Banks and starring Harald Madsen, Enid Stamp-Taylor and Carl Schenstrøm.

Plot
The guardian of an heiress tries to destroy the reputation of her lover by planting drugs on him.

Cast
 Carl Schenstrøm as Gin
 Harald Madsen as It
 Enid Stamp-Taylor as Betty
 Harry Terry as Bosco
 Tony Wylde as Jerry
 Nigel Barrie as Giles
 Lorna Duveen as Mary
 Warren Hastings as Judge

References

Bibliography
 Low, Rachael. History of the British Film, 1918-1929. George Allen & Unwin, 1971.

External links

1928 films
1928 comedy films
British buddy comedy films
Films shot at British International Pictures Studios
1920s English-language films
Films directed by Monty Banks
Films set in England
British black-and-white films
British silent feature films
1920s British films
Silent comedy films